"City Zoo" is a song written and recorded by Hong Kong singer-songwriter G.E.M. for her seventh studio album of the same name (2019). G.E.M. produced the song with Terrence Ma, and was released on December 13, 2019, by Sony Music Taiwan as the second single from the album. "City Zoo" is a Mandopop genre song. Over a retro-styled musical motif, G.E.M. sings lyrics about the living postures of various animals, and reflects social phenomena.

Background and composition
"City Zoo" the album title track, which incorporates a large number of hip-hop arrangements,  Describe the living postures of various animals, reflects social phenomena, and sneers at the dark side of how everyone may appear at some moment and hope that everyone can clear the temptation of false lies with the clearest vision and make the best choice.

Music video
The music video for "City Zoo" was directed by OuterSpace Leo. The video was premiered on the listening session for the album "City Zoo" on December 13, 2019. The  video is set in a computerized atmosphere and contains an interpolation of Michael Jackson's album art cover and several other art covers and movies. As of June 2020, the music video has gained over 11 million views.

References

2019 songs